The 2019 California Golden Bears men's soccer team represented University of California, Berkeley during the 2019 NCAA Division I men's soccer season and the 2019 Pac-12 Conference men's soccer season. The regular season began on August 30 and concluded on November 14. It was the program's 114th season fielding a men's varsity soccer team, and their 20th season in the Pac-12 Conference. The 2019 season was Kevin Grimes's twentieth year as head coach for the program.

Roster

Schedule 

|-
!colspan=6 style=""| Non-conference regular season
|-

|-
!colspan=6 style=""| Pac-12 Conference regular season
|-

|-
!colspan=6 style=""| NCAA Tournament
|-

References 

2019
California Golden Bears
California Golden Bears
California Golden Bears men's soccer
California Golden Bears